Calahan Wade Skogman (born May 12, 1993) is an American actor and former collegiate basketball and football player. He plays Matthias Helvar in the Netflix series Shadow and Bone.

Life and career
Skogman was born in Green Bay to parents Wade and Stefani, and moved to Seymour, Wisconsin as a child. He is of Swedish, English, and German descent on his father's side and Italian and Hungarian on his mother's. He has a younger brother, Clayton. His great uncle is the Budapest-born artist Steven Kemenyffy.

Having played basketball "since I could walk", Skogman earned four titles in basketball and football at Seymour Community High School and was recruited to the Wisconsin Basketball Coaches Association All-State team as a junior and senior. He had ambitions to join the NBA. In his final year of high school, Skogman was accepted early to the University of Minnesota Duluth. He studied history and played NCAA Division II basketball and football, earning a letter in both sports.

After freshman year, Skogman transferred to the University of Wisconsin–La Crosse where he earned a All-WIAC First Team Honor. He began his studies in Broadcasting and hosted a sports radio show CWSports: The Handle on the campus station RAQ Radio. However, he landed the main role in a production of The Metal Heart, took up acting, and eventually decided to switch his major to Theatre Performance, graduating in 2015.

He moved to Los Angeles and went on to obtain a Master of Fine Arts in Acting from the USC School of Dramatic Arts in 2019.

In December 2019, it was announced Skogman would play Matthias Helvar in the 2021 Netflix series Shadow and Bone, an adaptation of the fantasy book series The Grisha Trilogy and the Six of Crows duology by Leigh Bardugo. A recurring character in season 1, Skogman has been promoted to series regular for season 2.

Filmography

References

External links

Living people
1993 births
21st-century American male actors
American people of English descent
American people of German descent
American people of Hungarian descent
American people of Italian descent
American people of Swedish descent
Male actors from Wisconsin
Minnesota Duluth Bulldogs men's basketball players
Minnesota Duluth Bulldogs football players
People from Green Bay, Wisconsin
People from Seymour, Wisconsin
People of Tuscan descent
USC School of Dramatic Arts alumni
Wisconsin–La Crosse Eagles men's basketball players
Wisconsin–La Crosse Eagles football players